Blea Tarn  is a lake in Cumbria, England, located about half a mile north of Beckfoot.

References

Lakes of the Lake District
Borough of Copeland